Yevgeniya Kutsepalova (born 7 June 1978) is a Belarusian biathlete. She competed in three events at the 2002 Winter Olympics.

References

External links
 

1978 births
Living people
Biathletes at the 2002 Winter Olympics
Belarusian female biathletes
Olympic biathletes of Belarus
Place of birth missing (living people)